Jeff DeGroot (born September 2, 1985) is an American soccer player who currently plays for Dayton Dutch Lions in the USL Professional Division.

External links
 Dayton Dutch Lions bio

1985 births
Living people
American soccer players
Dayton Dutch Lions players
Association football defenders
USL Championship players